İnlice is a village in the Fethiye district of Muğla Province of southwestern Turkey.

Geography 
İnlice is located next to the village of Göcek in Muğla, on the road to Fethiye.

Villages in Fethiye District